The sixth season of Ídolos aired in 2015. João Manzarra was the presenter.

Semifinals Round
All the 20 finalists performed live at MEO Arena, but only 12 were chosen by the judges to perform at the live shows.

Finalists
João Couto (born 1995) is from Vila Nova de Gaia. For him, the hardest part of Ídolos was group stage. He wasn't seen as an Idol for many people, due to his look, but he improved a lot during the competition. He was announced as the winner on August 23, 2015. He is the fifth male winner, after the six seasons. Couto had never been in the bottom 2 or 3 until the Finale.

Sara Martins (born 1996) is from Barcelos. She did not audition, but she entered in the competition in the Theatre Round. She was asked to sing twice, in order for the judges to be able to qualify her and she sang "Creep" in a second performance. The judges all made huge compliments on her performance. She was in the Bottom 3, alongside Gonçalo and Albert, in the Top 11 round, and she was in the bottom 2, alongside Rita, in the Top 5 round.

Paulo Sousa (born 1991) is from Coimbra. He had already participated on the second season of Factor X (Portugal), but he was eliminated before the Finals. On the Top 9 round, the judges said he was too comfortable with his fan base that his performances were not improving. That night, he was in the bottom 3, but the following week, he gave one amazing performance, making the judges happy with his evolution. He was in the bottom 2, in the Semifinals Round, alongside Luís.

Finals

Top 12 - This Is Me
The six finalists with the highest number of votes (by the viewers) were automatically in the Top 10. Among the remaining 9, the judges have chosen 4 contestants to keep.

Top 11 (first week) - Cinema
Mafalda Portela was the contestant with the lowest number of votes, however, during her "saving performance", the judges interrupted it to say that they would keep her for another week. Carolina Bernardo and Miguel Moura dos Santo were both in the bottom 3.

Top 11 (second week) - Summer Festivals
Albert Tinho and Gonçalo Santos were the two finalists leaving the competition. Albert's name was the first to be revealed, but that doesn't necessarily mean that he was in 11th place. Sara Martins was shockingly in the bottom 3 and really close to be eliminated.

Top 9 - Dedications 
Mário Pedrosa is the fourth contestant to the leave the competition. Many people consider this one of the most shocking eliminations of the season, because Mário had never been in the bottom 3 in the first three live shows and many considered him a potential finalist. Rita Nascimento was also in the bottom 3 and Paulo Sousa was in the bottom 3 for the first time.

Top 8 - 80's 
Mafalda Portela was, once again, eliminated by the viewers, but, this time, there was no possible save. Curiously, she was, once again, in the bottom 3 with both Carolina Bernardo and Miguel Moura dos Santos.

Top 7 - Guilty Pleasures 
Miguel Moura dos Santos was eliminated this week, after being in the bottom 3 two times. He was in the bottom 3 with Carolina Bernardo and with Luís Travassos, who had never been in the bottom players until this point.

Top 6 - Viewers' Choice and Judges' Choice 
Carolina Bernardo was the seventh finalist to leave the competition. She was in the bottom 3 with Rita Nascimento and Luís Travassos. This was the first time that the contestants sang two songs. It was revealed the Top 3 of the night which included Sara Martins, João Couto and Paulo Sousa (who ended up being the real Top 3 of the game).

Top 5 - Madonna vs Michael Jackson 
Rita Nascimento sadly abandons the competition really close to the end, in 5th place. She was in the bottom 2 with Sara Martins, who wasn't in the bottom contestants for five weeks.

Top 4 - Duets / Year They Were Born

Top 3 - Finale (Part 1)

Top 2 - Finale (Part 2)

Elimination chart

 On June 14, the judges picked the Top 12, however, only 10 were chosen directly to perform on the live shows. Albert and Nelson sang once again and only Albert went through. The same situation happened with Rita and Maria, having Rita been chosen to the Top 12. This were the two Wild Card picks.
 During the live shows, João Manzarra only revealed the bottom three and the eliminated player. It has never been told which contestant had been in the bottom two with the eliminated one.
 On June 28, Mafalda Portela was the contestant with the fewest votes. However, the judges decided to use their only save on her. That decision meant that two singers would have to be eliminated the following week (Gonçalo and Albert).
 On August 23, the three finalists all performed two times. After those two performances, the contestant with the lowest number of votes was revealed to be Paulo Sousa, ending in third place. After that, the voting lines were reopened and João and Sara, the Top 2, sang another time. The final results were the combination of the votes received by them until Paulo's elimination and the votes received after that.

Controversy
On May 3, 2015, during the show's broadcast with a new episode, a 16-year-old contestant by the name of Alexandre Rebelo who had prominent ears auditioned to be on the show previously on March 27, 2015. Alexandre's grandmother gave him authorization to be in the casting, but he did not get to sing in front of the juries. He instead simply sung on camera with the song: "Diamonds" by Rihanna.

But what Alexandre didn't expect, the TV producers were bullying and making fun of him solely because of his hard of hearing. The TV producers went out of their way and maliciously decided to add a special effect via post-production onto Alexandre by inflating his ears in a much bigger size while he was still singing and the producers even added inappropriate cartoon-like background music without his knowledge and consent as the episode was being publicly broadcast across the entire country as for "humor." This embarrassed and humiliated Rebelo up to the point where he was skipping school and could not even leave his own home. He was very displeased upon seeing what happened during the episode when it was first broadcast, along with his grandmother who was in great despair crying because Alexandre always got bullied in school because of his ears.

SIC and FremantleMedia has since claimed that they regret pulling the move. On the Facebook page of the show however, several outraged comments were posted by many users forcing the producers of the show to apologize for such incident and for humiliating Alexandre. They apologized to the grandmother but she told them that an apology will simply not be enough to cover the damages that have been done towards her grandson. She wants true justice upon Alexandre's suffering and the following incident that was caused is going to be at a high cost.

A campaign has started by Alexandre himself to fight against bullying regarding SIC's action.

References

Ídolos (Portuguese TV series)
2015 Portuguese television seasons